Clinio Freitas (born 8 January 1964) is a Brazilian sailor. He received a bronze medal in the Tornado Class at the 1988 Summer Olympics in Seoul, South Korea with Lars Grael.

References

External links

1964 births
Living people
Brazilian male sailors (sport)
Sailors at the 1988 Summer Olympics – Tornado
Sailors at the 1992 Summer Olympics – Tornado
Olympic sailors of Brazil
Olympic bronze medalists for Brazil
Olympic medalists in sailing
Medalists at the 1988 Summer Olympics